pre)Thing was an American rock band, fronted by former Crazy Town member Rust Epique. Signed to V2 Records, the group released one demo and one major-label record, which came out after the lead singer's death in 2004.

History
Rust Epique, former guitarist for Crazy Town, left the group in 2001.  After cutting some demos Rust signed with V2 Records in 2002.  He then reassembled and  re-formed an ensemble called Rustandthesuperheroes. Soon after, they began playing clubs in the Los Angeles area. Due to a trademark conflict with Hanna-Barbera, the band couldn't use a moniker with the phrase "Superheroes" in it, so they used a name that Rust had created years earlier in Modesto. "pre)Thing".  At the Dragonfly in January 2003, they were billed under the name of "Daisy Town". An obvious wink and nudge to the LA hipster scene that followed his prior band, Crazy Town. This was the first performance with new bass player Jon Troy Winquist and drummer/producer Adam Hamilton. V2 mounted a major promotional campaign for pre)Thing. The recording sessions were led by Matt Sorum of Guns N' Roses and Velvet Revolver and legendary rock producer Andy Johns. The cd was one of the first ever to include a video game on the cd for pc users. There was a Rust Epique action figure, complete with a guitar, that was sent to radio stations. The single, "Faded Love", was one of the most added songs on the modern rock charts when it started getting airplay in February 2004. However, on March 9, 2004, one month before the scheduled release of the group's debut album, Rust died of a heart attack. 22nd Century Lifestyle was released on April 6, 2004, and a single from the album, "Faded Love," peaked at No. 38 on the US Billboard Mainstream Rock charts.

Members
 Rust Epique - Vocals and guitar
 JonTroy Winquist - Bass
 Dino Guerrero - Drums

Discography
 Diary in Music: Garage Days (Independent, 2002)
 22nd Century Lifestyle:Episode Rustandthesuperheroes Sexdrugsandsoutherncityrock (V2 Records, 2004)

References

External links
 Official website (Defunct; from Internet Archives)

Musical groups established in 2001
Musical groups disestablished in 2004
Nu metal musical groups from California